Crocodilium is a genus of flowering plants belonging to the family Asteraceae.

Its native range is Eastern Mediterranean.

Species:

Crocodilium creticum 
Crocodilium crocodylium

References

Cynareae
Asteraceae genera